The Birkavs cabinet was the government of Latvia from 3 August 1993 to 19 September 1994.  It was led by Prime Minister Valdis Birkavs.  It took office on 3 August 1993, after the July 1993 election.  It was replaced by the Krištopans cabinet on 26 November 1998, after the October 1998 election.

Cabinets of Latvia
1993 establishments in Latvia
1994 disestablishments in Latvia
Cabinets established in 1993
Cabinets disestablished in 1994